William W. Andrus (July 25, 1821August 28, 1910) was an American politician.

Early life
Andrus was born on July 25, 1821 in Middlebury, New York. In 1822, Andrus moved to Macomb County, Michigan with his father.

Career
Andrus was a physician, a surgeon, and a pharmacist. He was among the earliest physicians in Macomb County. In 1861, Andrus served as postmaster of Utica, Michigan. In 1867, Andrus severed as a delegate from Macomb County in the Michigan constitutional convention. Under President Ulysses S. Grant, Andrus served as Assessor of Internal Revenue in the 5th congressional district. In 1880, Andrus served as the treasurer of Shelby Township, Michigan.

On March 21, 1881, State Senator John T. Rich resigned to fill the vacancy left in the United States House of Representatives left by Congressman Omar D. Conger's resignation. By March 31, Andrus was nominated by the Republicans to fill the vacancy in the state senate left by Rich's resignation, and the Democrats had nominated John N. Mellen of Romeo. In April, Andrus was admitted to the state senate and sworn in. He served in this position until 1882.

In 1895, Andrus was appointed by Governor John T. Rich to the Macomb County jury commission for a term of two years.

Personal life
By October 7, 1898, Andrus' wife had died.

Death
Andrus died on August 28, 1910 in his Utica home.

References

1821 births
1910 deaths
City and town treasurers in the United States
Republican Party Michigan state senators
People from Wyoming County, New York
People from Utica, Michigan
Michigan postmasters
Internal Revenue Service people
Physicians from Michigan
19th-century American politicians
19th-century American physicians